Atarjea is a Mexican city and municipality located in the easternmost region of the state of Guanajuato, within the Sierra Gorda range. The municipality has an area of 318 square kilometres (1.04% of the surface of the state) and is bordered to the north by the state of San Luis Potosí, to the east and south by the state of Querétaro, and to the west by Xichú. The municipality had a population of 5,198 according to the 2005 census.

The name of the municipality is of Otomí origin and means "Where they go to drink water."

The municipal president of Atarjea and its many smaller outlying communities is Guadalupe Flores Loyola.

Localities in Atarjea

References

Municipalities of Guanajuato